DisneySea Transit Steamer Line is a steamboat attraction at Tokyo DisneySea.

Overview 
Steamboats travel through every themed lands' waters at Tokyo DisneySea and departure docks of this attraction are located at Mediterranean Harbor, American Waterfront and Lost River Delta. 

13 boats are operating and each of the ships are painted by 1 of 5 colors, red, blue, light blue, green, or yellow. Usually, the DisneySea Transit Steamer Line operates in a clockwise direction but when shows are being set up or performed at the Mediterranean Harbor, ships will take a temporary route.

References

External links
DisneySea Transit Steamer Line (Mediterranean Harbor)
DisneySea Transit Steamer Line (American Waterfront)
DisneySea Transit Steamer Line (Lost River Delta)

Tokyo DisneySea
Mediterranean Harbor (Tokyo DisneySea)
American Waterfront (Tokyo DisneySea)
Lost River Delta (Tokyo DisneySea)
Walt Disney Parks and Resorts attractions
Amusement rides introduced in 2001
2001 establishments in Japan
Steamboats